Pearsonema is a genus of nematodes belonging to the family Capillariidae.

The species of this genus are found in Europe and Northern America.

Species:
 Pearsonema feliscati (Diesing, 1851) 
 Pearsonema mucronata (Molin, 1858)

References

Nematodes